Daphne Gautschi (born 09 July 2000)  is a Swiss handball player for Neckarsulmer SU and the Swiss national team. Gautschi has a two-year deal at German Bundesliga club Neckarsulmer SU .

Achievements 

 Swiss U17 Youth Championship
 Winner 2015
 Swiss U19 Youth Championship
 Winner 2016
 Swiss Championship (SPL1)
 Finalist 2017
 First National team appearance
 06.06.2017 against Slowakia
 First Champions League appearance
 19.11.2017 against SG BBM Bietigheim (1 goal)

References

External links 
 (de)

Living people
2000 births
Swiss female handball players
People from Muri District
Sportspeople from Aargau
Swiss expatriate sportspeople in Germany